White Light Motorcade was a modern rock band from New York City.  The band consisted of Harley Di Nardo (vocals, guitars), Mark Lewis (guitars), Steven Slingeneyer (drums), Tommy Salmorin (bass).  In 2003, the band released their debut album, Thank You, Goodnight!  On Octone / A&M Records, produced by Brad Jones. The album showed the band's 1960s garage rock and 1970s glam influences.  Jones saw them at a NYC showcase and was impressed by the band's performance and song melodies and signed them.

In December 2003, the band created a video for "My Way", featuring Sophie Lovell Anderson and Huggy Leaver.  Shandrach Lindo directed a video for the single "One In Three". Both videos featured the band's new drummer, Richard Stuverud.

Shortly after the release of Thank You, Goodnight! the band began touring with Ash, The Donnas, OK Go and were on the MTV2 / CMJ Advance Warning Tour.

Albums
 Thank You, Goodnight!  2003 Octone Records
 Take me to your party  2005 Fatbone/Media Factory

Thank You, Goodnight! tracklist
 Open Your Eyes
 It's Happening
 All Gone Again
 My Way
 Semi Precious
 Closest
 We Come Together
 Dream Dat
 I Could Kick Myself
 Useless
 Looking At Stars
 On Top

Take Me To Your Party tracklist
 Take Me To Your Party
 Giant Hole
 One In Three
 What Are We Waiting For
 Sunshine In Your Eyes
 Worst Case Scenario
 Heard It All
 Let's Get Together
 Wish I Could Stop
 So Unsatisfied
 Beautiful Life
 Say Yes
 After Party

References

External links
 Discogs

Living people
Indie rock musical groups from New York (state)
2003 debut albums
Year of birth missing (living people)